Utricularia floridana, the Florida yellow bladderwort, is a large affixed aquatic carnivorous plant in the bladderwort genus  within the bladderwort family). It is a perennial plant that is endemic to southeastern United States (Florida, Georgia, Alabama, and the Carolinas).

See also 
 List of Utricularia species

References

External links
photo of herbarium specimen at Missouri Botanical Garden, collected in Lake County in Florida, isotype of Utricularia floridana
Atlas of Florida Vascular Plants
Nia Wellendorf, 2011. How to Distinguish the Aquatic Bladderworts. Department of Environmental Protection, Standards and Assessment Section photos of several species and discussion of identification criteria
Makoto Honda. Carnivorous Plants - Utricularia floridana - Early May, 2009. description and photos

Carnivorous plants of North America
Plants described in 1896
Flora of the Southeastern United States
Aquatic plants
floridana
Flora without expected TNC conservation status